Glenda Joy Stirling (married name Biddle, born 7 July 1952) is a former New Zealand swimmer who represented her country at the 1968 Summer Olympics and 1970 British Commonwealth Games.

Early life and family
Stirling was born in Auckland on 7 July 1952. Her father was Ivor Gerald Stirling and her mother was Joyce Agnes Stirling (née Hunter), a daughter of politician Lorrie Hunter. She married Jack Edward Biddle, and the couple went on to have five children. Her brother, Ken, was a New Zealand rugby league international, as was her father.

Swimming
Stirling competed in three events at the 1968 Summer Olympics, reaching the final and finishing eighth in the 100 m backstroke. She also competed in the 200 m backstroke and  medlay relay, but did not progress beyond the heats. At the 1970 British Commonwealth Games in Edinburgh, she competed in the same three events, finishing fourth in both the 100 m backstroke and  medlay relay, and sixth in the 200 m backstroke.

References

External links
 
 

1952 births
Living people
New Zealand female swimmers
Female backstroke swimmers
Olympic swimmers of New Zealand
Swimmers at the 1968 Summer Olympics
Swimmers at the 1970 British Commonwealth Games
Commonwealth Games competitors for New Zealand
Swimmers from Auckland